The 2001 UEFA–CAF Meridian Cup was the third UEFA–CAF Meridian Cup and was held in Italy.

Teams

  (host nation)

Standings

Results

UEFA–CAF Meridian Cup
Mer
Meridan
Meridan
International association football competitions hosted by Italy